Rajgarh is a town and a nagar panchayat in Sirmaur district in the Indian state of Himachal Pradesh. It was a Princely State ruled by Raja of Raghuvanshi lineage.

Geography
It has an average elevation of 1,555 metres (5,102 feet).

Demographics
 India census, Rajgarh had a population of 2,527. Males constitute 56% of the population and females 44%. Rajgarh has an average literacy rate of 79%, higher than the national average of 59.5%; male literacy is 83%, and female literacy is 73%. 11% of the population is under 6 years of age.

Popularly known as the Peach valley, Rajgarh is a green valley in Sirmour district. Rajgarh has two sub-divisions, namely Rajgarh and Sarahan, the latter of which is also a valley of Sirmaur. Rajgarh was ruled by the chiefs of Raghuvanshi lineage, who used the title Maharaja. Rajgarh is about 40 km from Solan. At Rajgarh, rest houses belonging to the PWD and Forest Department are available for visitors, besides private hotels and guest houses.

The people of Rajgarh are religious and worship Shiva Durga. The local Shaya temple of Lord Shirgul has a mammoth following. According to a legend, Lord Shirgul first came to Shaya village and later settled in Churdhar Mountain at a height of 12,000 feet. 

The Baru Sahib Gurdwara also lies in this valley, and is 29 km from Rajgarh. It is located beyond Kheri on the banks of a tributary of the Giri River.

The adjacent Habban contains thick pine fir, kail, baan and deodar forests, as well as orchards of apples and peaches. The climate is moderate year-round and in winter, Habban occasionally has snow. Habban is about 70 km from Solan via Yashwant Nagar and Rajgarh. The town of Haripurdhar is about a two-hour journey from Rajgarh and is famous for the Bhangayani Temple, dedicated to a god sister of Lord Shirgul, the principal deity whose seat is at Churdhar. PWD rest houses and a trekker's hut are available for travellers, besides the Sarai in the temple. Nohradhar, which lies halfway between Rajgarh and Haripurdhar, is a base for trekking to Churdhar, with routes including Sailpaw-Dokhta-Churdhar (7 km), Haripurdhar-Churdhar (17 km), Nohradhar-Churdhar (14 km), Sarahan-Churdhar (7 km), and Habban-Churdhar (15 km).

Related links
Maa Bhangayani Temple, Haripurdhar
Churdhar Sanctuary
Baru Sahib

References

Cities and towns in Sirmaur district